Demi Moore is an American actress, who has received 25 award nominations for roles across American film and television, winning 6 of them. These include nominations for a Critics' Choice Movie Award, a Directors Guild of America Award, two Golden Globe Awards, a Primetime Emmy Award and a Screen Actors Guild Award.

Moore made her film debut with the science fiction horror film Parasite (1982), and subsequently appeared on the soap opera General Hospital (1982–1984) and was a short-lived member of the Brat Pack, having roles in Blame It on Rio (1984), St. Elmo's Fire (1985), and About Last Night... (1986). Her role as Molly Jensen in the romantic fantasy thriller film Ghost (1990) garnered her praise; she earned a nomination for the Golden Globe Award for Best Actress – Motion Picture Comedy or Musical, and won the Saturn Award for Best Actress. For her performances in the legal drama film A Few Good Men (1992), the drama film Indecent Proposal (1993), the erotic thriller film Disclosure (1994), the romantic drama film The Scarlet Letter (1995), the action films G.I. Jane (1997) and Charlie's Angels: Full Throttle (2003), Moore obtained a total of nine MTV Movie & TV Award nominations, winning in 1994 for Best Kiss.

Moore attained critical attention for her role in the HBO television film If These Walls Could Talk (1996), which she also executive produced. She received a nomination for the Golden Globe Award for Best Actress – Miniseries or Television Film and the Primetime Emmy Award for Outstanding Television Movie. As part of the ensemble in the drama film Bobby (2006) and the financial thriller film Margin Call (2011), she was given various accolades: for Bobby, she earned a nomination for the Critics' Choice Movie Award for Best Acting Ensemble and the Screen Actors Guild Award for Outstanding Performance by a Cast in a Motion Picture, meanwhile for Margin Call, she won the honorary Robert Altman Award at the Independent Spirit Awards. She made her directorial debut with the comedy-drama anthology television film Five (2011), which earned her a nomination for the Directors Guild of America Award for Outstanding Directing – Miniseries or TV Film.

Awards and nominations

References

Moore, Demi